Paulo César Araújo (27 October 1934 – 4 April 1991), commonly known as Pagão, was a Brazilian footballer who played as a forward.

Honours

Club
Santos
Intercontinental Cup: 1962
Copa Libertadores: 1962
Taça Brasil: 1961, 1962
Torneio Rio – São Paulo: 1959, 1963
Campeonato Paulista: 1955, 1956, 1958, 1960, 1961, 1962

References

External links
UOL Esporte biography 

1934 births
1991 deaths
Sportspeople from Santos, São Paulo
Brazilian footballers
Association football forwards
Associação Atlética Portuguesa (Santos) players
Santos FC players
São Paulo FC players
Brazil international footballers